The Bank for International Settlements (BIS) is an international financial institution owned by central banks that "fosters international monetary and financial cooperation and serves as a bank for central banks". The BIS carries out its work through its meetings, programmes and through the Basel Process – hosting international groups pursuing global financial stability and facilitating their interaction. It also provides banking services, but only to central banks and other international organizations. It is based in Basel, Switzerland, with representative offices in Hong Kong and Mexico City.

History 

The BIS was established in 1930 by an intergovernmental agreement between Germany, Belgium, France, the United Kingdom, Italy, Japan, the United States, and Switzerland. It opened its doors in Basel, Switzerland, on 17 May 1930.

The BIS was originally intended to facilitate reparations imposed on Germany by the Treaty of Versailles after World War I, and to act as the trustee for the German Government International Loan (Young Loan) that was floated in 1930. The need to establish a dedicated institution for this purpose was suggested in 1929 by the Young Committee, and was agreed to in August of that year at a conference at The Hague. The charter for the bank was drafted at the International Bankers Conference at Baden-Baden in November, and adopted at a second Hague Conference on January 20, 1930. According to the charter, shares in the bank could be held by individuals and non-governmental entities. However, the rights of voting and representation at the Bank's General Meeting were to be exercised exclusively by the central banks of the countries in which shares had been issued. By agreement with Switzerland, the BIS had its corporate existence and headquarters there. It also enjoyed certain immunities in the contracting states (Brussels Protocol 1936).

The BIS's original task of facilitating World War I reparation payments quickly became obsolete. Reparation payments were first suspended (Hoover moratorium, June 1931) and then abolished altogether (Lausanne Agreement, July 1932). Instead, the BIS focused on its second statutory task, i.e. fostering the cooperation between its member central banks. It acted as a meeting forum for central banks and provided banking facilities to them. For instance, in the late 1930s, the BIS was instrumental in helping continental European central banks ship out part of their gold reserves to London. 

As a purportedly apolitical organization, the BIS was unable to prevent transactions that reflected contemporaneous geopolitical realities, but were also widely regarded as unconscionable. As a result of the policy of appeasement of Nazi Germany by the UK and France, in March 1939, the BIS was obliged to transfer 23 tons of gold it held, on behalf of Czechoslovakia, to the German Reichsbank, following the German annexation of Czechoslovakia.

At the outbreak of World War II in September 1939, the BIS Board of Directors – on which the main European central banks were represented – decided that the Bank should remain open, but that, for the duration of hostilities, no meetings of the Board of Directors were to take place and that the Bank should maintain a neutral stance in the conduct of its business. However, as the war dragged on evidence mounted that the BIS conducted operations that were helpful to the Germans. Also, throughout the war, the Allies accused the Nazis of looting and pleaded with the BIS not to accept gold from the Reichsbank in payment for prewar obligations linked to the Young Plan. This was to no avail as remelted gold was either confiscated from prisoners or seized in victory and thus unacceptable as payment to the BIS. Operations conducted by the BIS were viewed with increasing suspicion from London and Washington. The fact that top-level German industrialists and advisors sat on the BIS board seemed to provide ample evidence of how the BIS might be used by Hitler throughout the war, with the help of American, British and French banks.

The 1944 Bretton Woods Conference recommended the "liquidation of the Bank for International Settlements at the earliest possible moment". This resulted in the BIS being the subject of a disagreement between the U.S. and British delegations. The liquidation of the bank was supported by other European delegates, as well as Americans (including Harry Dexter White and Secretary of the Treasury Henry Morgenthau Jr.). Abolition was opposed by John Maynard Keynes, head of the British delegation.

Keynes went to Morgenthau hoping to prevent or postpone the dissolution, but the next day it was approved; the liquidation of the bank was never actually undertaken. In April 1945, the new U.S. president Harry S. Truman ended U.S. involvement in the scheme. The British government suspended the dissolution and the decision to liquidate the BIS was officially reversed in 1948.

After World War II, the BIS retained a distinct European focus. It acted as Agent for the European Payments Union (EPU, 1950–58), an intra-European clearing arrangement designed to help the European countries in restoring currency convertibility and free, multilateral trade. During the 1960s – the heyday of the Bretton Woods fixed exchange rate system – the BIS once again became the locus for transatlantic monetary cooperation. It coordinated the central banks' Gold Pool and a number of currency support operations (e.g. Sterling Group Arrangements of 1966 and 1968. The Group of Ten (G10), including the main European economies, Canada, Japan, and the United States, became the most prominent grouping.

With the end of the Bretton Woods system (1971–73) and the return to floating exchange rates, financial instability came to the fore. The collapse of some internationally active banks, such as Herstatt Bank (1974), highlighted the need for improved banking supervision at an international level. The G10 Governors created the Basel Committee on Banking Supervision (BCBS), which remains active. The BIS developed into a global meeting place for regulators and for developing international standards (Basel Concordat, Basel Capital Accord, Basel II and III). Through its member central banks, the BIS was actively involved in the resolution of the Latin American debt crisis (1982).

From 1964 until 1993, the BIS provided the secretariat for the Committee of Governors of the Central Banks of the Member States of the European Community (Committee of Governors). This Committee had been created by the European Council decision to improve monetary cooperation among the EC central banks. Likewise, the BIS in 1988–89 hosted most of the meetings of the Delors Committee (Committee for the Study of Economic and Monetary Union), which produced a blueprint for monetary unification subsequently adopted in the Maastricht Treaty (1992). In 1993, when the Committee of Governors was replaced by the European Monetary Institute (EMI – the precursor of the ECB), it moved from Basel to Frankfurt, cutting its ties with the BIS.

In the 1990s–2000s, the BIS successfully globalized, breaking out of its traditional European core. This was reflected in a gradual increase in its membership (from 33 shareholding central bank members in 1995 to 60 in 2013, which together represent roughly 95% of global GDP), and also in the much more global composition of the BIS Board of Directors. In 1998, the BIS opened a Representative Office for Asia and the Pacific in the Hong Kong SAR. A BIS Representative Office for the Americas was established in 2002 in Mexico City.

The BIS was originally owned by both central banks and private individuals, since the United States, Belgium and France had decided to sell all or some of the shares allocated to their central banks to private investors. BIS shares traded on stock markets, which made the bank an unusual organization: an international organization (in the technical sense of public international law), yet allowed for private shareholders. Many central banks had similarly started as such private institutions; for example, the Bank of England was privately owned until 1946. In more recent years the BIS has bought back its once publicly traded shares. It is now wholly owned by BIS members (central banks), but still operates in the private market as a counterparty, asset manager and lender for central banks and international financial institutions. Profits from its transactions are used, among other things, to fund the bank's other international activities.

After the 2022 Russian invasion of Ukraine, in March 2022 the BIS suspended the Bank of Russia's membership.

Organization of central banks 

As an organization of central banks, the BIS seeks to make monetary policy more predictable and transparent among its 60-member central banks, except in the case of Eurozone countries which forfeited the right to conduct monetary policy in order to implement the euro. While monetary policy is determined by most sovereign nations, it is subject to central and private banking scrutiny and potentially to speculation that affects foreign exchange rates and especially the fate of export economies. BIS aims to keep monetary policy in line with reality and to help implement monetary reforms in time, preferably as a simultaneous policy among all 60 member banks and also involving the International Monetary Fund.

Central banks do not unilaterally "set" rates, rather they set goals and intervene using their massive financial resources and regulatory powers to achieve monetary targets they set. One reason to coordinate policy closely is to ensure that this does not become too expensive and that opportunities for private arbitrage exploiting shifts in policy or difference in policy, are rare and quickly removed.

Two aspects of monetary policy have proven to be particularly sensitive, and the BIS, therefore, has two specific goals: to regulate capital adequacy and make reserve requirements transparent.

Regulates capital adequacy 
Capital adequacy policy applies to equity and capital assets. These can be overvalued in many circumstances because they do not always reflect current market conditions or adequately assess the risk of every trading position. Accordingly, the Basel standards require the capital/asset ratio of internationally active commercial banks to be above a prescribed minimum international standard, to improve the resilience of the banking sector.

The main role of the Basel Committee on Banking Supervision, hosted by the BIS, is setting capital adequacy requirements. From an international point of view, ensuring capital adequacy is key for central banks, as speculative lending based on inadequate underlying capital and widely varying liability rules cause economic crises as "bad money drives out good" (Gresham's Law).

Encourages reserve transparency 
Reserve policy is also important, especially to consumers and the domestic economy. To ensure liquidity and limit liability to the larger economy, banks cannot create money in specific industries or regions without limit. To make bank depositing and borrowing safer for customers and reduce the risk of bank runs, banks are required to set aside or "reserve".

Reserve policy is harder to standardize, as it depends on local conditions and is often fine-tuned to make industry-specific or region-specific changes, especially within large developing nations. For instance, the People's Bank of China requires urban banks to hold 7% reserves while letting rural banks continue to hold only 6%, and simultaneously telling all banks that reserve requirements on certain overheated industries would rise sharply or penalties would be laid if investments in them did not stop completely. The PBoC is thus unusual in acting as a national bank, focused on the country and not on the currency, but its desire to control asset inflation is increasingly shared among BIS members who fear "bubbles", and among exporting countries that find it difficult to manage the diverse requirements of the domestic economy, especially rural agriculture, and an export economy, especially in manufactured goods.

Effectively, the PBoC sets different reserve levels for domestic and export styles of development. Historically, the United States also did this, by dividing federal monetary management into nine regions, in which the less-developed western United States had looser policies.

For various reasons, it has become quite difficult to accurately assess reserves on more than simple loan instruments, and this plus the regional differences has tended to discourage standardizing any reserve rules at the global BIS scale. Historically, the BIS did set some standards which favoured lending money to private landowners (at about 5 to 1) and for-profit corporations (at about 2 to 1) over loans to individuals. These distinctions reflecting classical economics were superseded by policies relying on undifferentiated market values – more in line with neoclassical economics.

Goal: monetary and financial stability 
The stated mission of the BIS is to serve central banks in their pursuit of monetary and financial stability, to foster international cooperation in those areas and to act as a bank for central banks. The BIS pursues its mission by:
 fostering discussion and facilitating collaboration among central banks;
 supporting dialogue with other authorities that are responsible for promoting financial stability;
 carrying out research and policy analysis on issues of relevance for monetary and financial stability;
 acting as a prime counterparty for central banks in their financial transactions; and
 serving as an agent or trustee in connection with international financial operations.

The role that the BIS plays today goes beyond its historical role. The original goal of the BIS was "to promote the co-operation of central banks and to provide additional facilities for international financial operations; and to act as trustee or agent in regard to international financial settlements entrusted to it under agreements with the parties concerned", as stated in its Statutes of 1930.

Role in banking supervision 
The BIS hosts the Secretariat of the Basel Committee on Banking Supervision and with it has played a central role in establishing the Basel Capital Accords (now commonly referred to as Basel I) of 1988, Basel II framework in 2004 and more recently Basel III framework in 2010.

Financial results 
BIS denominates its reserve in IMF special drawing rights. The balance sheet total of the BIS on 31 March 2019 was SDR 291.1 billion (US$403.7 billion) and a net profit of SDR 461.1 million (US$639.5 million).

Members 
Sixty-three central banks and monetary authorities are currently members of the BIS and have rights of voting and representation at general meetings. The number of countries represented in each continent are: 35 in Europe, 15 in Asia, 5 in South America, 3 in North America, 3 in Africa, and 2 in Oceania. The 63 members represent the following countries:

Central Bank of the Russian Federation was suspended in March 2022 (see "History", above).

Leadership 
The first chairman was Gates W. McGarrah (1863–1940), who had risen from the job of cashier at a New York industrial bank to its president, and later the first Chairman of the Federal Reserve Bank of New York. The chairs concurrently held the role of president from April 1930 to May 1937 and July 1946 to 27 June 2005, when it was abolished. Johan Beyen of the Netherlands served as president from May 1937 to December 1939 and the position was vacant until July 1946.

BIS Chairs

BIS General Managers

Board of directors 

 Andrew Bailey, London
 Roberto Campos Neto, Brasília
 Shaktikanta Das, Mumbai
 Alejandro Díaz de León Carrillo (es), Mexico City
 Stefan Ingves, Stockholm
 Thomas Jordan, Zurich
 Klaas Knot, Amsterdam
 Haruhiko Kuroda, Tokyo
 Christine Lagarde, Frankfurt am Main
 Chang Yong Rhee, Seoul
 Tiff Macklem, Ottawa
 Jerome H. Powell, Washington, D.C.
 François Villeroy de Galhau, Paris
 Ignazio Visco, Rome
 John C. Williams, New York
 , Brussels
 Yi Gang, Beijing

Criticism
Strong criticisms of the financial institution have been made by Dutch economist and author Ronald D. Bernard  who argues that numerous transactions bordering on ethics and legality have been passed through the BIS since its founding, beginning with the business dealings that the British and Americans allegedly had with the Germans during World War II, particularly in connection with the sale of gold seized by the Nazis from German Jews: "Everything that could not stand the light of day, passed through it, by a devious means".

Red Books 
One of the Group's first projects, a detailed review of payment system developments in the G10 countries, was published by the BIS in 1985 in the first of a series that has become known as "Red Books". Currently, the red books cover countries participating in the Committee on Payments and Market Infrastructures (CPMI). A sample of statistical data in the red books appears in the table below, where local currency is converted to US dollars using end-of-year rates.

See also 

 Bank regulation
 Basel III

 CLS Group
 Financial Stability Board
 Global financial system
 International Court of Justice
 League of Nations

References

External links 

 
 "They've Got a Secret" by Michael Hirsh, The New York Times, 2013 (a book review of Tower of Basel, Adam LeBor, 2014)
 "The Money Club", by Edward Jay Epstein, Harper's, 1983.
 Andrew Crockett statement to the IMF
 , by Henry C K Liu in the Asia Times.
 , Timewatch, Paul Elston, producer Laurence Rees, narrator Sean Barrett (UK), BBC, 1998 (a video documentary about the BIS role in financing Nazi Germany)
 eabh (The European Association for Banking and Financial History e.V.)
 
 

1930 establishments in Switzerland
Banks established in 1930
Central banks
International banking institutions
International finance institutions
International Settlements